This is a list of states and territories of India by number of people for whom Malayalam is their mother tongue (first language) as of census 2001. Gross population figures are

References

Malayalam language
Malayalam
Malayalam-related lists